Radha is a 2005 novel written by Krishna Dharabasi, winner of prestigious Nepali literary award Madan Puraskar. The novel was an adaptation of the ancient Sanskrit epic Mahabharat, giving greater prominence to the character of Radha. Inspired by Jacques Derrida's Theory of Deconstruction, Dharabasi completely changed the characters of Radha and Krishna, making Radha brave, dignified and revolutionary.

Synopsis 
The plot of Radha reflects the situation in Nepal at the time of its publication, especially the Nepalese Civil War.

Radha is an example of “Lila Lekhan”, a Nepalese metaphysical novel concerned with explaining the features of reality that exist beyond the physical world and our immediate senses, for which Dharabasi is known.

Translation 
The book is translated into English as Radha: Love, War, and Renunciation by Mahesh Paudyal.

Reception 
The book won the prestigious Madan Puraskar for the year 2062 BS (2005).

See also 

 Palpasa Café
 Maharani
 Ghamka Pailaharu

References

Nepalese novels
Nepali-language books
Madan Puraskar-winning works
21st-century Nepalese novels
Works about the Nepalese Civil War
2005 Nepalese novels
Nepali-language novels